Serhiy Chuichenko (born 25 October 1968) is the Soviet and Ukrainian professional footballer.

Career
He is a record holder together with Vadym Plotnikov (FC Stal Alchevsk) for goals scored in the Ukrainian First League with 117 goals. Chuichenko has another record for goals scored in a single season 36 (1995/96). Around that time he was a leading scorer in the First League for couple of seasons.

In 1998, Chuichenko moved to Turkmenistan and joined Köpetdag Aşgabat. He led the club to the championship and was drafted into the Turkmenistan national football team after becoming naturalised.

References

External links

Profile at KLISF
 PFL website of 9 July 2010 

1968 births
Living people
Footballers from Kharkiv
Soviet footballers
Ukrainian footballers
Turkmenistan international footballers
Turkmenistan footballers
Ukrainian Premier League players
FC APK Morozovsk players
FC Dnipro players
FC Vorskla Poltava players
FC Vorskla-2 Poltava players
FC Naftovyk-Ukrnafta Okhtyrka players
FC Metallurg Lipetsk players
FC Metalist Kharkiv players
FC Elektron Romny players
Turkmenistan people of Ukrainian descent
Ukrainian expatriate footballers
Ukrainian expatriate sportspeople in Russia
Ukrainian expatriate sportspeople in Turkmenistan
Association football forwards